Darren Jones may refer to:

Darren Jones (footballer) (born 1983), Welsh footballer
Darren Jones (politician) (born 1986), British politician
Darren Jones (screenwriter), British author who has written for the French animated TV series Zou